The Visitors Challenge Cup is a rowing event for men's coxless fours at the annual Henley Royal Regatta on the River Thames at Henley-on-Thames in England.  It is open to male crews from all eligible rowing clubs and has similar qualifying rules to the Ladies' Challenge Plate. Two or more clubs may combine to make an entry.

Past winners

References

Events at Henley Royal Regatta
Rowing trophies and awards